Tsubouchi (written: 坪内) is a Japanese surname. Notable people with the surname include:

, Canadian politician
, Japanese footballer
, Japanese writer

Japanese-language surnames